Manildra is a closed railway station on the Broken Hill railway line in New South Wales, Australia. The station opened in 1893 and is closed to passenger services. It was used for safeworking purposes for a time after its closure to passenger services. Manildra is home to the Manildra Group, largest industrial wheat producer in Australia, and various rail sidings allow goods trains to service the mill.

References

Disused regional railway stations in New South Wales
Railway stations in Australia opened in 1893